The Episcopal Diocese of Rochester is the diocese of the Episcopal Church in the United States of America with jurisdiction over eight counties in west central New York. It is bounded on the north by Lake Ontario, on the east by the Episcopal Diocese of Central New York, on the south by the Episcopal Diocese of Central Pennsylvania and on the west by the Episcopal Diocese of Western New York. It is in Province 2 and has no cathedral. Its diocesan offices are in Henrietta, New York.

History
At first the Episcopal Diocese of New York encompassed the whole state. By 1837 the "west" was booming, and the Diocese of Western New York was created. In 1873 the new diocese had grown significantly. Bishop Arthur Cleveland Coxe began recommending the partition of the diocese. David Lincoln Ferris, bishop coadjutor of Western New York since 1924, succeeded Charles Henry Brent as bishop in 1929. The partition of the Diocese of Western New York was finally approved by the national church's 1931 General Convention. That December the new Episcopal Diocese of Rochester came into being.

The diocese was newly created, though many of the congregations had already begun more than a century before. In 1816 when John Henry Hobart, Third Bishop of New York, began his work, congregations were active in Avon, Canandaigua, Geneva, Clifton Springs, Catharine, and Bath. On 15 and 16 December 1931, forty congregations sent delegations to the primary convention of the new diocese at Trinity Church, Geneva, where the 1837 primary convention of the Diocese of Western New York had also been held.
At first much of the administration of the diocese was handled in Bishop Ferris' home at 325 Park Avenue, Rochester. Soon the diocese rented a suite of rooms in the Hiram Sibley Building, at 311 Alexander Street. In 1947 the Trustees purchased "Church House" at 110 Merriman Street. In 1954 Elizabeth Sibley Stebbins died, one of the early leaders in the diocese. Her home at 935 East Avenue became "Diocesan House".
The Second World War moved Bishop Bartel H. Reinheimer (1938-1949) and his service group, the "Bishop's Men," to send aid to the Diocese of Rochester, England, where post-war privations and rationing were still severe. The Woman's Auxiliary, working on both congregational and diocesan levels, helped raise money and direct the mission of the church under Bishops Reinheimer, Dudley S. Stark (1950-1962), and George W. Barrett (1963-1969).

The Fifth Bishop of Rochester, Robert Rae Spears, Jr. (1970-1984), helped the diocese to deal with issues like: how to interpret the Bible, whether to ordain women and gay people, and - among others - how to distribute the enormous legacy left to the diocese by Margaret Woodbury Strong's will. That financial windfall gave rise to the diocese's district system in 1972. The system's original purpose was to give voices to people and congregations throughout the diocese in using the Strong Fund. A large portion of the fund eventually went to help the National Episcopal Church and its mission.

Bishops

Current bishop
Prince G. Singh was elected the eighth Bishop of Rochester on February 2, 2008 and was consecrated at the Eastman Theatre in Rochester, New York, on May 31, 2008, by Katharine Jefferts Schori, the Presiding Bishop. Co-Consecrators of the service were Jack M. McKelvey, George Councell, John Croneberger, Mark M. Beckwith, Carol Gallagher, and Marie Jerge, Bishop of the Upstate New York Synod of the Evangelical Lutheran Church in America. Singh became the diocesan Bishop of Rochester at the close of the consecration service on May 31, 2008.

Past bishops

Jack M. McKelvey
Jack M. McKelvey was the seventh bishop of Rochester from 2000 to 2008. He has a master's of divinity and an honorary doctorate from Virginia Theological Seminary. He was suffragan bishop of the Episcopal Diocese of Newark from 1991-1999.  McKelvey currently serves as interim president at Colgate Rochester Crozer Divinity School.

Robert Rae Spears, Jr.
The fifth Bishop of Rochester, Robert Rae Spears, Jr. (1970-1984), helped the diocese to deal with issues that rocked the church: how to interpret the Bible, whether to ordain women and gay people, and - among others - how to distribute the enormous legacy left to the diocese by Margaret Woodbury Strong's will.

List of bishops
The bishops of Rochester have been:

 David L. Ferris, (1931–1938), who previously served the Episcopal Diocese of Western New York as suffragan bishop (1920–1924), coadjutor bishop (1924) - 1929) and fifth diocesan bishop, (1929–1931).* Bartel H. Reinheimer, coadjutor bishop (1936)
 Bartel H. Reinheimer, (1938–1949)
 Dudley S. Stark, (1950–1962)
 George W. Barrett, (1963–1969)
 Robert R. Spears, Jr., (1970–1984; d. 2008)
 William G. Burrill, (1984–1999)
 Jack M. McKelvey, (2000–2008)
 Prince G. Singh, (2008–present)

See also

 List of Succession of Bishops for the Episcopal Church, USA

References

External links
Episcopal Diocese of Rochester, NY website
Official Facebook page of the Episcopal Diocese of Rochester, NY
Official website of the Episcopal Church

1931 establishments in New York (state)
Anglican dioceses established in the 20th century
Christian organizations established in 1931
Rochester
Episcopal Church in New York (state)
Province 2 of the Episcopal Church (United States)